The 1926 Spring Hill Badgers football team was an American football team that represented Spring Hill College, a Jesuit college in Mobile, Alabama, during the 1926 college football season. In its second season under head coach William T. Daly, the team compiled a 3–2–1 record.

Schedule

References

Spring Hill
Spring Hill Badgers football seasons
Spring Hill Badgers football